Ali Khan Mansur (also known as Mansur ul-Mulk‎; 1886 – 8 December 1974) was the Prime Minister of Iran for two terms between 1940 and 1941 and in 1950.

Biography
Born in Tehran, he served as Governor of Khorasan and Azarbaijan provinces, and was an ambassador to Italy, The Vatican, and Turkey.

He served twice as Prime Minister (from 1940 to 1941, and again in 1950) and six times as Cabinet Minister.  He resigned as Prime Minister several days after 25 August 1941, when British and Soviet troops invaded Iran to suppress German activity.

Before World War II, Mansur was the minister of roads and railway during construction of the Trans-Iranian Railway.  After World War II, Mansur was appointed governor general of Azerbaijan in 1946 and was appointed ambassador to Turkey in 1953.

His son, Hassan Ali Mansur, served as prime minister from 1964 to 1965.

See also
List of Iranian Prime Ministers

References

Other References
 'Alí Rizā Awsatí (عليرضا اوسطى), Iran in the past three centuries (Irān dar Se Qarn-e Goz̲ashteh - ايران در سه قرن گذشته), Volumes 1 and 2 (Paktāb Publishing - انتشارات پاکتاب, Tehran, Iran, 2003).  (Vol. 1),  (Vol. 2).

External links

Prime Ministers of Iran
Revival Party politicians
Governors of East Azerbaijan Province
Governors of West Azerbaijan Province
People from Tafresh
Politicians from Tehran
1886 births
1974 deaths
20th-century Iranian politicians